Junior MasterChef Pinoy Edition was a Philippine competitive cooking game show that aired from 2011 to 2012. The series was adapted out of the British show Junior MasterChef, in turn was a spin-off based on MasterChef, featuring Filipino contestants aged 8 to 12. It was broadcast on ABS-CBN starting with a pre-series primer station network on 20 August 2011.

Judy Ann Santos-Agoncillo presents the show, while professional Filipino chefs Fern Aracama, Rolando Laudico, and JP Anglo judge the contestants.

On 24 September, ABS-CBN announced the show's new time slot on Sundays starting on 2 October 2011.

The show ended on 18 February 2012 with Kyle Imao as the winner and was replaced by Kapamilya, Deal or No Deal.

Primer
The pre-series primer entitled The Appetizer aired on 20 August 2011. It featured the basic format of the show, while being introduced by the presenter and chef judges. Viewers also got to take an eyewitness look at the auditions, and the narrow down to the Top 60.

Episodes

Top 20

 Legend:
  The kiddie cook is the winner.
  The kiddie cooks are the runners-up.
  The kiddie cook was eliminated/re-eliminated from the competition.
  The kiddie cook voluntarily quit the competition.

 Notes:
 – Philip Amarillo was 12 years old, the maximum age for the kiddie cooks, during his audition for the show last February 2011. Afterwards, he turned 13 on 16 July 2011.
 – Gino Yang voluntarily quit the show to participate in an international culinary summer camp in China, where his application has been approved.

Elimination Chart

 Legend:
 The kiddie cook is the winner of the competition/challenge.
 The kiddie cook was one of the top entries in the individual challenge, but did not win.
 The kiddie cook was part of the winning team in a team challenge.
 The kiddie cook was part of the bottom 5/6/8 scoring contestants who were at risk of elimination, but was not eliminated.

 Notes:

: The top 20 chefs have cooked practical dish with accordance to the food allowance of an average Filipino family. The judges stated that the winner of the challenge will get 6 points and the other two of the best will get 4 and 2 points. Miko was hailed as the winner together with Bianca and Louise finishing second and third place and has the power to choose the main ingredient for the invention test.
: The 20 Kiddie Cooks went to Barasoain Church for the next competition. They were divided into two teams, the Green Team and Yellow Team. Kyle was the winner in last competition so he will choose one of the kiddie cooks to be joined him and that was Miko. Then Kyle distributed the clay pots for the other kiddie cooks to know where is their team. The top 20 will cook rice cakes. They will choose 3 recipes for each team. There will be an adviser for each team to advise on the cooking of rice cakes. Then the 100 churchgoers will be the judge for their kakanin. The 100 churchgoers will choose who is their bet on the best kakanin. On the other hand, the plates will put on table to know who will be the winner. Green Team wins, so they will have a 6 points while the Yellow Team earned 3 points.
: For elimination challenge, the bottom 6 kiddie cooks were tasked to cook their own Adobo dish version. As a result, Athena and Bea were eliminated from the competition.
: Two winners are chosen.
: The elimination challenge is a Pressure Test.
: It was announced that three kiddie cooks will be eliminated this round.
: The kiddie cooks are divided into 5 groups of three.
: It was announced that only 1 kiddie cook will be eliminated this round.
: It was announced that there would be a Bottom 8.
: Jobim was absent during the Test/Challenge so he was given 1 point. 
: The elimination consisted of two parts. Skills Test and Invention Test.

See also
List of programs broadcast by ABS-CBN Corporation
Junior MasterChef
MasterChef

References

External links

ABS-CBN original programming
Philippine reality television series
Pinoy Edition Junior
2011 Philippine television series debuts
2012 Philippine television series endings
Philippine television series based on British television series
Filipino-language television shows
Television series about children
Television series about teenagers